The Diocese of Spiš is a Roman Catholic diocese in northern Slovakia. It covers central and eastern parts of the Žilina Region and western part of the Prešov Region. Its seat is in Spišská Kapitula; the diocese covers an area of 7,802 km2 with 583,633 people of which 76.6% are of Catholic faith (2004). The seat is vacant after the death of bishop Štefan Sečka. Auxiliary bishop Ján Kuboš has been elected as a Diocesan Administrator, until new bishop is named by the pope and duly inaugurated.

History
The diocese was established in the Kingdom of Hungary on 13 March 1776 as a suffragan of the Archdiocese of Esztergom. In 1804, its metropolitan was changed to the Archdiocese of Eger. On 30 December 1977, it was taken from the former and became part of the newly created Slovak ecclesiastical province with metropolitan being the Diocese of Trnava. The last change of metropolitan took place on 31 March 1995 when it was changed to the newly elevated Archdiocese of Košice.

External links
 Official website 
 Diocese of Spiš at catholic-hierarchy.org
 Diocese of Spiš at newadvent.org

Catholic Church in Slovakia
Roman Catholic dioceses in Slovakia
Spiš
Religious organizations established in 1776
Roman Catholic dioceses and prelatures established in the 18th century
1776 establishments in Europe